Nikao is a village settlement on Rarotonga in the Cook Islands. It is located on the north coast to the west of the capital Avarua.

Nikao is the home of the Parliament of the Cook Islands, Tereora College (the oldest secondary school), Nikao's modern Cook Islands Christian Church, the Rarotonga International Airport and the first division football team Nikao Sokattak F.C. Originally, Nikao consisted of three tapere or settlements (Rangiura, Turamatuitui and Pokoinu). Most of the people of Pokoinu lived near the sea, but after extensions were made to the airport, the people were moved inland towards the mountain. Today they call that new tapere, "Tepuka". The new village of Nikao has three new tapere (Panama, Atupa and Tepuka). Black Rock (Tuoro) is also located at Nikao beach, across the street from the Golf Club, where in oral tradition the spirits of the dead are believed to depart for Avaiki.

References

Populated places in the Cook Islands
Rarotonga